Kent Anderson may refer to:

 Kent Anderson (novelist) (born 1945), American author
 Kent Anderson (baseball) (born 1963), American baseball player
 Kent Anderson (American football), American football coach and player